Shades of Fern is a 1984 Czechoslovak crime film directed by František Vláčil. It is based on a novella by Josef Čapek of the same name.

Plot
Rudolf works in a quarry and likes to illegally hunt in a local forest. He is often accompanied by his friend Václav. One day, they are caught by a Gamekeeper and they murder him. They hide the body and run away. They are seen by an older couple and realize they have to leave the village. They are hiding in forest and are trying to avoid police. Vašek becomes sick and Rudolf wants to leave him behind but Václav goes on. They meet Rousová and try to rape her but she escapes. They are later found by Policeman Marjánka and Rudolf shoots him. Sensitive Václav is scared of Rudolf's brutality. they are surrounded by police and Rudolf is killed. Václav is hiding at his body whole night. He kills himself in the morning before policemen can arrest him.

Cast
Marek Probosz as Rudolf Aksamit
Zbigniew Suszyński as Václav Kala
Miroslav Macháček as Gamekeeper/Vagabund/Beggar
František Peterka as Father Aksamit
Vladimír Hlavatý as Čepelka
Milada Ježková as Čepelka's wife

Reception

Accolades

References

External links
 

1986 films
1986 crime drama films
Czech crime drama films
1980s Czech-language films
Czechoslovak drama films
Films directed by František Vláčil